Invalid may refer to:
 Patient, a sick person
 one who is confined to home or bed because of illness, disability or injury (sometimes considered a politically incorrect term)
 .invalid, a top-level Internet domain not intended for real use

As the opposite of valid:

 Validity, in logic, true premises cannot lead to a false conclusion
 Validity (statistics), a measure which is measuring what it is supposed to measure

See also
 
 
 Void (disambiguation)